Bodwad is a small town in Jalgaon district of Maharashtra in India. It is the administrative center of the state Maharshtra in Bodwad Taluka.

Demographics 
According to the 2011 population census, Bodwad has a population of 24,221, of which 12,588 are males and 11,633 are females. There are 3,118 children between the ages of 0 and 6, which comprises 12.87% of the population. Bodwad is known for Cotton production and corn.
Dry area.

Politics 
Former president of India Pratibha Patil hails from this taluka. Her ancestral village, Nadgaon, is a few miles away from Bodwad and is part of Muktainagar assembly constituency. From 1989-2019 former Revenue Minister of Maharashtra, Eknath Khadse was MLA of this constituency. Before splitting from Bhusawal, Bodwad was part of Bhusawal Taluka.

Education facilities 
The taluka contains the Government ITI institute at Nadgaon village.

References

Cities and towns in Jalgaon district
Talukas in Maharashtra